National Treasure is a 2004 American action-adventure heist film released by Walt Disney Pictures. It was written by Jim Kouf and the Wibberleys, produced by Jerry Bruckheimer, and directed by Jon Turteltaub. It is the first film in the National Treasure franchise and stars Nicolas Cage in the lead role, Harvey Keitel, Jon Voight, Diane Kruger, Sean Bean, Justin Bartha and Christopher Plummer. In the film, Benjamin Franklin Gates, a historian, along with friend Riley Poole and archivist Abigail Chase, search for a massive lost Freemason treasure, to which a map is hidden on the back of the Declaration of Independence.

National Treasure was released worldwide on November 19, 2004. The film grossed $347 million worldwide and received mixed reviews from critics, who praised the action scenes and performances but criticized the premise and screenplay. A sequel, National Treasure: Book of Secrets, was released in 2007.

At the 2022 D23 Expo, a sequel TV series, National Treasure: Edge of History, was announced. It was released on the Disney+ streaming service on December 14, 2022.

Plot
Benjamin Franklin Gates is an American historian, cryptographer, and treasure hunter. When Ben was young, his grandfather John told him that, in 1832, Charles Carroll passed on a secret to their ancestor of a fabled treasure hidden in America by the Knights Templar, Founding Fathers, and Freemasons. Carroll's secret was a clue leading to the treasure: the phrase "the secret lies with Charlotte". While Ben is convinced by the story, his skeptical father, Patrick, dismisses it as nonsense.

Thirty years later, Ben and his friend, computer expert Riley Poole, head an expedition financed by wealthy Ian Howe to find the Charlotte, revealed to be a ship lost in the Arctic. Within the ship, they find a meerschaum pipe, whose engravings reveal the next clue is on the Declaration of Independence. When Ian reveals himself to be a crime boss and suggests stealing the Declaration, a fight ensues, and the group splits. Ben and Riley report Ian's plan to the FBI and Abigail Chase of the National Archives, but no one believes them. Ben decides to protect the Declaration by removing it from the Archives' preservation room during a gala event. Obtaining Abigail's fingerprints, he successfully obtains the Declaration, only to be spotted by Ian's group just as they break in to steal it. Ben tries to leave via the gift shop but has to pay for the Declaration when the cashier mistakes it for a souvenir copy. Suspecting something amiss, Abigail confronts Ben and takes back the document. Ian promptly kidnaps her, but Ben and Riley rescue Abigail, tricking Ian by leaving behind a souvenir copy of the Declaration. FBI Agent Sadusky begins tracking Ben down.

Going to Patrick's house, the trio studies the Declaration and discovers an Ottendorf cipher written in invisible ink. The message refers to Benjamin Franklin's Silence Dogood letters. Patrick formerly owned them, but donated them to the Franklin Institute. Paying a schoolboy to view the letters and decipher the code for them, Ben, Riley, and Abigail discover a message pointing to the bell tower of Independence Hall. Pursued by Ian, they find a brick containing a pair of spectacles with multiple colored lenses, which, when used to read the back of the Declaration, reveal a clue pointing to Trinity Church. Ian's associates chase the trio through Philadelphia until the FBI arrests Ben. Abigail and Riley lose the Declaration to Ian, but Abigail convinces Ian to help them rescue Ben in exchange for the next clue. Ian agrees, arranging a meeting at the USS Intrepid, where they help Ben evade the FBI.

Ian returns the Declaration and asks for the next clue, but when Ben remains coy, Ian reveals he has taken Patrick hostage. They travel to the Trinity Church, where they find an underground passage that appears to lead to a dead end, lit by a lone lantern. Patrick claims it is a reference to the Midnight Ride of Paul Revere, pointing Ian to the Old North Church in Boston. Ian traps Ben, Abigail, Riley, and Patrick in the chamber, heading for Boston, which was Patrick's intent as the clue was fictitious and he knew that Ian would betray them. Ben then finds a notch the meerschaum pipe fits into, opening a large chamber containing the treasure, with a staircase to the surface. Ben contacts Sadusky, who is actually a Freemason, and surrenders the Declaration and the treasure's location in exchange for letting Abigail go free, giving the Gates family and Riley credit for the discovery, and no prison sentence. On a tip from Ben, the FBI arrests Ian for kidnapping and other crimes.

Later, Ben and Abigail have started a relationship, while Riley is somewhat upset that Ben turned down the 10% finder's fee for the treasure so the entire collection could go to museums. But the 1% he did accept has still netted them all significant wealth.

Cast

 Nicolas Cage as Benjamin Franklin Gates:An American treasure hunter and cryptographer.
 Hunter Gomez as young Benjamin Gates
 Sean Bean as Ian Howe:An entrepreneur, crime boss and treasure hunter who is a former friend of Benjamin Gates.
 Diane Kruger as Dr. Abigail Chase:An archivist at the National Archives who aids Benjamin Gates in treasure hunting.
 Justin Bartha as Riley Poole:A sardonic computer expert and friend of Benjamin Gates.
 Jon Voight as Patrick Henry Gates:A former treasure hunter and the father of Benjamin Gates.
 Harvey Keitel as Agent Peter Sadusky:An FBI Special Agent in pursuit of the stolen Declaration of Independence.
 Christopher Plummer as John Adams Gates:The father of Patrick Gates and the grandfather of Benjamin Gates.

Jack Koenig portrays a young version of Founding Father Charles Carroll; David Dayan Fisher appears as Shaw, Stewart Finlay-McLennan as Powell, Oleg Taktarov as Viktor Shippen, and Stephen Pope as Phil McGregor (Ian's henchmen); Annie Parisse, Mark Pellegrino, Armando Riesco, and Erik King play agents Dawes, Ted Johnson, Hendricks, and Colfax, respectively. Jason Earles portrays Thomas Gates.

Production

Development
By early 1999, it was revealed that Jon Turteltaub was developing National Treasure based upon an idea developed by Oren Aviv and Charles Segars in 1997, with a script by Jim Kouf. By 2001, the project was relocated to Touchstone Pictures.

In May 2003, Nicolas Cage was cast as the lead. New drafts were written by nine scribers, including Cormac and Marianne Wibberley, E. Max Frye, and Jon Turteltaub. By October, Sean Bean was cast.

Filming locations
National Treasure was filmed primarily in Washington, New York, Philadelphia and Utah. Most scenes were filmed on location, with the exceptions of the Independence Hall scene, portions of which were filmed at the replica of Independence Hall at Knott's Berry Farm, and the Arctic scene, which was filmed in Utah. An in-depth analysis of the movie's various filming locations, including ways in which the movie highlights real aspects of the locations' histories, can be found in the 2023 nonfiction book National Treasure Hunt: One Step Short of Crazy, authored by franchise experts Aubrey R. Paris and Emily M. Black (unaffiliated with the Walt Disney Company).

Soundtrack

Portrayal of Declaration of Independence
The film's suggestion that the original Declaration of Independence still has clearly visible ink is inaccurate. The document's ink dried over time due to exposure to damaging lighting, with little ink still existing by 1876. But viewers are often surprised to learn that many plot points in National Treasure and its sequel are inspired by true, often little-known, events in history. Since 2020, an independent podcast, the National Treasure Hunt, has conducted deep dives into many of these historical events.

Reception

Box office
National Treasure earned $11 million on its opening day in the United States, ahead of Paramount & Nickelodeon's The SpongeBob SquarePants Movie (which earned $9,559,752). It grossed $35,142,554 during its opening weekend, on 4,300 screens at 3,243 theaters, averaging $11,648 per venue, again ahead of The SpongeBob SquarePants Movie. The film had the best opening weekend for a Disney film released in November until it was surpassed by Chicken Little in 2005. It held on to the No. 1 spot for three weekends. In Japan, National Treasure bested the double-billing MegaMan NT Warrior: Program of Light and Dark and Duel Masters: Curse of the Deathphoenix, grossing $11,666,763 in its first week. The film closed on June 2, 2005, with a domestic gross of $173,008,894 and earning $174,503,424 internationally. Worldwide, National Treasure grossed over $347,512,318, against a budget of $100 million.

Critical reception
On Rotten Tomatoes, the film has an approval rating of 46% based on 179 reviews, and an average rating of 5.30/10. The site's consensus reads, "National Treasure is no treasure, but it's a fun ride for those who can forgive its highly improbable plot." On Metacritic, the film has a score of 39 out of 100, based on 35 critics, indicating "generally unfavorable reviews". Audiences polled by CinemaScore gave the film an average grade of "A−" on an A+ to F scale.

Roger Ebert gave the film 2/4 stars, calling it "so silly that the Monty Python version could use the same screenplay, line for line." Academic David Bordwell has expressed a liking for the film, placing it in the tradition of 1950s Disney children's adventure movies, and using it as the basis for an essay on scene transitions in classical Hollywood cinema.

Awards

Home media
National Treasure was released on Disney DVD in May 2005. In keeping with the movie's theme, the DVD contains a "Bonus Treasure Hunt": viewers who watch the Special Features on the disc are rewarded with puzzles and codes that unlock more features.

Collector's Edition DVD
To help promote Book of Secrets, a special collector's edition, two-disc DVD set of the movie was released on December 18, 2007. The set features a bonus disc containing additional deleted scenes and documentaries.

Blu-ray
Walt Disney Studios Home Entertainment released Blu-ray versions of National Treasure and its sequel, National Treasure 2: Book of Secrets, on May 20, 2008.

Sequels

Although the DVD commentary stated that there were no plans for a sequel, the film's box office gross of an unexpected $347.5 million worldwide warranted a second film, which was given the green light in 2005. National Treasure: Book of Secrets was released on December 21, 2007.

In 2008, director Jon Turteltaub said that the filmmaking team would take its time on another National Treasure sequel. In October 2013, Turteltaub confirmed that he, the studio, producer Jerry Bruckheimer, and the actors all wanted to do a third film, saying: "We want to do the movie, Disney wants to do the movie. We're just having the damnedest time writing it. I'll bet that within two years, we'll be shooting that movie. I'd say we're about halfway there." In May 2016, Cage confirmed the film was still in the writing process, and in July 2018, Turtletaub reiterated that a script for a possible third film was "close", but Disney still was not completely sold on it. In January 2020, it was announced that Chris Bremner, the writer of Bad Boys for Life, would write a new script.

In May 2020, Jerry Bruckheimer confirmed that, not only was there a third film in development with the original cast returning, but also that a Disney+ series was in the works with the same premise as the original, but focusing on a much younger cast.

During an April 2022 AMA (Ask Me Anything) thread on Reddit, Cage said of the possibility of future installments: "No, the priority was to turn it into a TV show so I would say probably not."

See also
 Arnold Cipher
 Beale ciphers
 Nicholas Dietrich, Baron de Ottendorf

References

External links

 
 
 
 

2004 films
2000s adventure films
2000s heist films
American adventure films
American heist films
Walt Disney Pictures films
2000s English-language films
Films about Freemasonry
Films directed by Jon Turteltaub
Films produced by Jerry Bruckheimer
Films scored by Trevor Rabin
Films set in 1974
Films set in 2004
Films set in Massachusetts
Films set in New York City
Films set in New Jersey
Films set in Pennsylvania
Films set in Philadelphia
Films set in Washington, D.C.
Films shot in New York City
Hollywood Records soundtracks
Museums in popular culture
Treasure hunt films
Cryptography in fiction
American Revolutionary War films
United States Declaration of Independence
Cultural depictions of George Washington
Cultural depictions of Thomas Jefferson
Cultural depictions of Benjamin Franklin
Saturn Films films
Secret histories
National Treasure (film series)
2000s American films